The Futian incident is the common title for the December 1930 purge of a battalion of the Jiangxi-Fujian Soviet's "Red Army" at Futian (now in Ji'an's Qingyuan District). The Futian battalion's leaders had mutinied against Mao Zedong's purge of the Jiangxi Action Committee, ordered on the pretext of its alleged connection to the Anti-Bolshevik League and ties to Trotskyism.

Background
In response to the Anti-Bolshevik League incident, the Futian battalion rebelled against Mao, claiming that Mao was attempting to arrest generals Zhu De and Peng Dehuai, and surrender to the KMT army. The officers of the first battalion, 174 regiment, 20th Corps, led by Liu Di (刘敌) retreated to the town of Yongyang, where they raised banners reading 'Down with Mao Zedong!' and sent appeals to the CCP Central Committee in Shanghai. In response to the rebellion, in June 1931, Mao called the troops and their officers to a meeting, saying that they would discuss and resolve their differences. 200 came to a local hall, but as soon as they were all seated, troops who were loyal to Mao disarmed them and executed them. 

During the Futian incident Zhu De and Peng Dehuai were unequivocal supporters of Mao, despite their different political positions. This allowed Mao's position as leader of the Red Army to be vindicated.

Further developments
In September 1956, Mao admitted that the purges during the Anti-Bolshevik League incident, as well as the Futian incident, were a mistake, in which the wrong people were killed. In 1988, President Yang Shangkun commissioned an investigation into the Futian incident, which recommended the rehabilitation of the victims, but it was never followed up due to the Tiananmen Square protests and subsequent massacre.

See also
Chinese Soviet Republic
Anti-Bolshevik League incident

References 

Massacres in China
1930 in China
Political and cultural purges